iOS 5 is the fifth major release of the iOS mobile operating system developed by Apple Inc., being the successor to iOS 4. It was announced at the company's Worldwide Developers Conference on June 6, 2011, and was released on October 12, 2011. It was succeeded by iOS 6 on September 19, 2012.

iOS 5 revamped notifications, adding temporary banners that appear at the top of screen and introducing the Notification Center, a central location for all recent notifications. The operating system also added iCloud, Apple's cloud storage service for synchronization of content and data across iCloud-enabled devices, and iMessage, Apple's instant messaging service. For the first time, system software updates could be installed wirelessly, without requiring a computer and iTunes. iOS 5 also featured deep integration with Twitter, introduced multitasking gestures on iPads, and added an easily accessible camera shortcut from the lock screen.

iOS 5 was the subject of criticism for iPhone 4S users, as the initial release had poor battery life, failures of SIM cards, and echoes during phone calls. These problems were fixed in subsequent releases.

History

Introduction and initial release 
iOS 5 was introduced at the Apple Worldwide Developers Conference on June 6, 2011, with a beta version available for developers later that day.

iOS 5 was officially released on October 12, 2011.

System features

Notifications 
In previous iOS versions, notifications popped up on the screen as dialog boxes, interrupting the current activity. In iOS 5, notifications are revamped, and show up as a temporary banner at the top of the screen. Recent notifications can also be accessed by pulling a "Notification Center" down from the top of the screen. Users who prefer the old notification system can keep it by choosing the appropriate option in the Settings menu.

iCloud 
iOS 5 introduces iCloud, Apple's cloud storage service. The new service allows users to synchronize their music, pictures, videos, and application data across all of their iCloud-enabled devices for free.

Wireless updates 
iOS 5 enables wireless system updates on supported devices, meaning a computer and iTunes aren't necessary to update devices. Both activation of new devices and updates can be done wirelessly.

Twitter integration 
iOS 5 features deep Twitter integration. Users are able to sign in to Twitter directly from the Settings menu. Photos can be "tweeted" directly from the Photos or Camera apps, and users are also able to tweet from the Safari, YouTube, and Google Maps apps.

Multitasking 
Multitasking gestures debut on iPad with the release of iOS 5. Multitasking allows users to jump between apps without double-tapping the home button or first going to the home screen. Multitasking gestures were only available on the iPad 2.

Keyboard 
The iPad keyboard could be undocked from the bottom of the screen, and could be split into two half-keyboards.

Siri 
Siri, Apple's voice assistant, is supported on the iPhone 4S only. It was later extended to other devices in iOS 6.

App features

Photos and Camera 
The first iOS 5 release allowed the Camera app to be easily accessed from the lock screen for the first time. Users double-clicked the home button, a camera icon would appear next to the "Slide to unlock" message, and users would click on it to directly access the camera. The iOS 5.1 update streamlined the process, dropping the home button double-click procedure, but requiring users to swipe up the camera icon. For security purposes when the device is locked with a passcode, this method of accessing the camera only allows access to the Camera app, and no other features of the device.

Pressing the volume-up button allows the user to take a picture.

Messages 
iMessage, a new instant messaging service built into the Messages app, allowed anyone with an iOS 5 device to send both basic and multimedia messages to anyone else with a compatible iOS 5 device. In contrast to SMS, messages sent through iMessage use the Internet rather than regular cellular texting, but also in contrast to regular SMS, Android and BlackBerry devices are not compatible with the service. iMessages are synchronized across the user's devices, and are color-coded blue, with regular SMS in green.

Mail 
The iOS Mail app included rich text formatting, better indent control, flagging of messages, and the ability to drag addresses between To, CC, and BCC lines.

Reminders 
Reminders allows users to create lists of tasks with alerts that can either be date-based or location-based.

Newsstand 
Newsstand does not act as a native app, but rather a special folder. When selected, it shows icons for all of the periodicals that the user has subscribed to, such as newspapers and magazines. New issues are downloaded automatically.

Music and Videos 
The iPod app was replaced by separate Music and Videos apps.

Problems

Initial upgrade issues 
The initial October 2011 release of iOS 5 saw significant upgrade issues, with errors during installation and Apple server overload.

iPhone 4S battery life 
Following user complaints, Apple officially confirmed that iOS 5 had poor battery life for some iPhone 4S users, and stated that an upcoming software update would fix the issues. The iOS 5.0.1 update fixed bugs related to battery issues.

Wi-Fi connectivity drops 
In November 2011, Engadget reported that the iOS 5 update caused Wi-Fi connection drops for some users. The report also wrote that "The recent iOS 5.0.1 update certainly hasn't fixed the matter, either", and questioned whether the events were unrelated or part of a larger issue.

SIM card failure 
Some iPhone 4S users reported issues with the SIM card in iOS 5, being given error messages about "Invalid SIM" and "SIM Failure". Apple released a second software build of the 5.0.1 update designed to fix SIM card issues.

Phone call echo 
Some iPhone 4S users reported the random appearance of echoes during phone calls made with earphones in the initial release of iOS 5. The other party in the call was sometimes unable to hear the conversation due to this problem.

Reception 
Many aspects of iOS 5 received positive reviews, including the new notification center, the ability to sync and update wirelessly, iMessage, and more. Richmond Shane of Telegraph said "iOS 5 is a brilliant upgrade to an already brilliant operating system. Different people look for different things in a mobile operating system. That's why some people prefer BlackBerry, Android or Windows Mobile. I value ease of use and attention to detail in design. With iOS 5, Apple continues to deliver the best user experience available."

Richard Goodwin of Know Your Mobile said "All in all, we reckon iOS 5 is everything it needs to be a more. We can't wait to get our teeth stuck into it as soon as it's released in the Autumn of 2011."

Supported devices
With this release, Apple dropped support for older devices, specifically the iPhone 3G and the second-generation iPod Touch.

iPhone
iPhone 3GS
iPhone 4
iPhone 4S

iPod Touch
iPod Touch (3rd generation)
iPod Touch (4th generation)

iPad
iPad (1st generation)
iPad 2
iPad (3rd generation)

Apple TV
Apple TV (2nd generation)
Apple TV (3rd generation)

Version history

References

External links
 

5
2011 software
Products introduced in 2011
Mobile operating systems
Tablet operating systems
Proprietary operating systems